Nagaya (長屋, "longhouse") is a type of rowhouse, which was typical for Edo period in Japan.

Nagaya was a long housing complex under the same ridge, one or two stories high, divided into small compartments for rent. The well, toilet and waste facilities were shared. Except for a bedroom, each household only had a kitchen. Historically, similar houses were built around a rich manor or castle for low-ranking samurai. Later they accommodated both samurai and commoners. At the ends of the building shops were located typically, their owners lived in adjacent rooms.
The wealthier tenants lived in the rooms facing the street. Usually the tenants of a nagaya didn't have a family. The rooms had an earthen floor, with a size of 8-10 square meters.

Nagaya were also known as yakeya (burning houses), due to their tendency to catch fire.

If a gateway was located in one section, such a house was called nagayamon (長屋門, longhouse-gate).

See also
 Minka (vernacular houses)
 Machiya (a larger townhouse)

References 

Japanese architectural history